Max Julius Friedrich Brauer (3 September 1887 – 2 February 1973) was a German politician of the Social Democratic Party (SPD) and the first elected First Mayor of Hamburg after World War II.

Life 
In 1923, Brauer was mayor of the independent city of Altona, Prussia, incorporated into Hamburg after 1937. Brauer fled the Nazi regime to the United States in 1933 with a passport of a friend. In 1934 Brauer's German citizenship was revoked. In July 1946 he came back to Hamburg working for the American Federation of Labor. In October 1946 after the election of the Hamburg Parliament, Brauer was elected as the First Mayor of Hamburg. After Brauer complained in a letter to the British forces about the supply shortfall in Hamburg, the British Governor Vaugham H. Berry stopped the heating in the officers' mess until there were a solution.

On 16 October 1949, the  took place. Brauer's party, the SPD, got 65 of the 120 seats there. His new Hamburg government ("") started February 1950. In October 1953, the next election took place. The SPD got only 58 of the 120 seats; an alliance including the CDU got the other 62 seats. Kurt Sieveking (CDU) became Brauer's successor; the  started in December 1953.
On , the SPD got 69 of the 120 seats. Brauer and his  started working. Brauer had promised to Paul Nevermann (born 1902) that he would transfer power to him before the end of the term. The 'era Brauer' ended 20 December 1960 with extensive ceremonies.

He was not a candidate for the next federal election in 1965; his successor in his electoral ward Hans Apel (1932–2011) became an important SPD politician and minister (finance, defence).

Brauer is buried in Altona Main Cemetery.

Honours 
In 1960, Brauer was given the honorary citizen award of Hamburg. The street Max-Brauer-Allee in the Altona borough is named after him.

Works 
 Brauer, Max. 1952. Consecration of the memorial for the Hamburg air raid victims: [speech at the inauguration on 16 August 1952 at Ohlsdorf Cemetery of the memorial for the Hamburg air raid victims.]

References

External links 

 
 http://www.hans-bredow-institut.de/nwdr/zz/Schwermer/artikel.htm
 http://library.fes.de/fulltext/afs/htmrez/80705.htm
 

1887 births
1973 deaths
Mayors of Hamburg
Exiles from Nazi Germany
Members of the Bundestag for Hamburg
Members of the Bundestag 1961–1965
Members of the Bundestag for the Social Democratic Party of Germany